Blair Lamar Thomas (born October 7, 1967) is a former professional American football running back in the National Football League for the New York Jets, New England Patriots, Dallas Cowboys, Atlanta Falcons and Carolina Panthers. He played college football at Penn State University.

Early years
Thomas was an all-state football player at Frankford High School in Philadelphia. In three seasons at Frankford, he rushed for 3,941 yards and tied a Public League career record with 59 touchdowns.

College career
Thomas accepted a football scholarship from Penn State University. He was a backup on the 1986 National Championship team, tallying 504 yards on 60 carries and 5 touchdowns. In 1987, he became a starter as a junior for head coach Joe Paterno, posting 1,414 yards on 268 carries and 11 touchdowns. In 1988, he was lost for the season with a serious right knee injury.

As a senior returning from reconstructive knee surgery, he averaged just 19 carries in the first 6 games, but ended strong by rushing for over 100-yards in six straight games, while registering 1,341 yards on 264 carries and 5 touchdowns. In the Holiday Bowl against Brigham Young, he rushed for a bowl record 186 yards on 35 carries, receiving Most Valuable Player honors. He was also named the MVP in the Senior Bowl after rushing for 137 yards on only 11 carries.

He finished second on the Nittany Lions’s all-time rushing list with 3,301 yards and 21 touchdowns, just 97 yards shy of the Penn State record set by Curt Warner. He averaged 5.5 yards per carry, . He was also the first player in school history to rush for more than 1,300 yards in two seasons (1987, 1989). He earned his Bachelor of Science in recreation and parks management at Penn State University in 1989.

In 2011, he was inducted into the Pennsylvania Sports Hall of Fame.

Professional career
Thomas was selected by the New York Jets in the first round (second overall) of the 1990 NFL Draft and was given the number 32, which no Jet had worn since the retirement of Emerson Boozer in 1975, with the expectation of developing into a great player. As a rookie, he was used as part of a four-man running back rotation that included Freeman McNeil, Johnny Hector and Brad Baxter. He posted 620 yards on only 123 carries, leading the NFL rookies in yards-per-carry (5 yards) and the AFC rookies in rushing yardage.

In his second season, head coach Bruce Coslet still used him in the same four-man running back rotation, but his carries increased to 189, finishing with 728 rushing yards and 3 touchdowns. In 1992, a series of injuries limited him to 9 games (7 starts), registering 440 yards on 97 carries.

The next year, he was used in a three-man running back rotation with Johnny Johnson and Brad Baxter. After injuring his hamstring in the fourth game and missing the next five contests, Johnson took over the starting role and went on to have 821 rushing yards, 641 receiving yards and 4 touchdowns. Thomas appeared in 11 games (5 starts), rushing for 221 yards and one touchdown in 59 carries. He became an unrestricted free agent at the end of the season.

Thomas is widely considered another in a long line of Jets draft disappointments, rushing for only 2,000 yards and five touchdowns in his four seasons with the team.

On March 31, 1994, he was signed as a free agent by the New England Patriots. He appeared in 4 games, rushing for 67 yards and one touchdown in 19 carries. On November 3, he was released to make room for defensive tackle Bruce Walker. On December 1, he was signed by the Dallas Cowboys to be the backup for Emmitt Smith.  In the Cowboys divisional playoff game against the Green Bay Packers, Thomas took over for an injured Smith and rushed for 70 yards and 2 touchdowns in the 35-9 win.

On June 15, 1995, he signed with the Atlanta Falcons, but was released on August 21. On November 7, he was signed by the Carolina Panthers for depth purposes while Derrick Moore was out with a knee injury.

Career statistics

Coaching career
Thomas served as running backs coach at Temple University for eight seasons, from 1998–2005. He played a key role in the development of Chicago Bears fullback Jason McKie, and Jacksonville Jaguars running back Stacey Mack.  Thomas was responsible for recruiting in Philadelphia, Eastern Pennsylvania and Southern New Jersey. He was also the team’s NFL liaison and summer football camp coordinator.

Thomas also serves as a volunteer instructor for Football University. In 2008, Thomas and several other ex-NFLers, conducted a youth football camp in Barrow, Alaska.  Barrow is so remote it is only accessible by airplane, and the local high school asked Football University for help with the difficult task of building a football program from scratch.

Personal life
Thomas resides in King of Prussia, Pennsylvania, with his wife Lisa. He has three children: Preston, Keisha, and Blair. Thomas, former Penn State and Philadelphia Eagles wide receiver Kenny Jackson, and local AFLAC agent Al Mayer are partners in a chain of Harrisburg, Pennsylvania-area sports bars called KoKoMos.

References

External links
Penn State bio
Jets' Thomas, Never a Star, Says He Didn't Get Roles

1967 births
African-American coaches of American football
African-American players of American football
American football running backs
Players of American football from Philadelphia
Carolina Panthers players
Dallas Cowboys players
Living people
New England Patriots players
New York Jets players
Penn State Nittany Lions football players
Sportspeople from Philadelphia
Temple Owls football coaches
21st-century African-American people
20th-century African-American sportspeople